Ganthem is a populated area, a socken (not to be confused with parish), on the Swedish island of Gotland. It comprises the same area as the administrative Ganthem District, established on 1January 2016.

Geography 
Ganthem is situated in the central east part of Gotland. The medieval Ganthem Church is located in the socken. , Ganthem Church belongs to Dalhem parish in Romaklosters pastorat, along with the churches in Dalhem, Hörsne and Ekeby.

References

External links 

Objects from Ganthem at the Digital Museum by Nordic Museum

Populated places in Gotland County